The Minister responsible for La Francophonie is a member of the Canadian Cabinet who handles relations with the Organisation internationale de la Francophonie, an international community of francophone nations considered the French equivalent of the Commonwealth of Nations.

Role 
The Minister responsible for the Francophonie is one of three ministers currently associated with the department Global Affairs Canada. A similar position exists at the provincial level in the Government of Quebec.

It is traditional that the minister be from Quebec or from a Francophone community outside Quebec. It is tacitly understood that the minister should speak French fluently.

List of ministers 
Jean-Luc Pépin (1983–1984)
Jean Chrétien (1984)
Monique Vézina (1984–1986)
Monique Landry (1986–1993)
Monique Vézina (1993) (second time)
André Ouellet (1993–1996)
Pierre Pettigrew (1996)
Don Boudria (1996–1997)
Diane Marleau (1997–1999)
Ronald Duhamel* (1999–2002)
Denis Paradis* (2002–2003)
Denis Coderre (2003–2004)
Jacques Saada (2004–2006)
Josée Verner (2006–2007)
Maxime Bernier (2007–2008)
Josée Verner (2008–2011); second time
Bernard Valcourt (2011–2013)
Steven Blaney (2013)
 Christian Paradis (2013–2015)
 Marie-Claude Bibeau (2015–2018)
 Mélanie Joly (2018–present)

(*)Secretary of State responsible for La Francophonie and not a member of Cabinet.

References 

Francophonie
Canada